Peter Chiarelli may refer to:

Peter W. Chiarelli (born 1950), former Vice Chief of Staff of the U.S. Army
Peter Chiarelli (ice hockey) (born 1964), ice hockey manager
Peter Chiarelli (screenwriter), American screenwriter and film producer

See also
Chiarelli